Jalabiro Forest Park is a forest park in the Gambia. Established on January 1, 1954, it covers 59 hectares.

It Is located in North Bank, the estimate terrain elevation above sea level is 12 metres.

References
  
 

Protected areas established in 1954
Forest parks of the Gambia